Peetre is an Estonian surname. Notable people with the surname include:

Jaak Peetre (born 1935), Estonian-Swedish mathematician
Peetre theorem
Peetre's inequality
Taavi Peetre (1983–2010), Estonian shot putter

See also
Peeter
Petre (disambiguation)

Estonian-language surnames